Natalie Walter (born 24 December 1979) is a British actress and writer who is best known for her film, theatre and television roles. During her career, Walter has worked with film and theatre directors including Peter Hall, Gregory Doran, Sam Mendes, Christopher Guest and Woody Allen. In 2020, Walter starred in the award-winning BBC and HBO drama I May Destroy You alongside the actor and writer Michaela Coel. Her father was David Walter, the former BBC and ITN journalist.

Education 
Walter studied at London's Drama Centre, where one of her classmates was the comedian and actor Russell Brand.

Television 
Walter's recent TV roles include starring as Francine in I May Destroy You, which won three awards at the 2021 Baftas, including for best mini-series. In the same year, Walter played Fizzy in Strike, the BBC's adaptation of JK Rowling's series of crime thriller novels Cormoran Strike. Since 2015, Walter has been a regular performer in the BBC's children's historical sketch comedy Horrible Histories. Her other notable television appearances include in The Thin Blue Line, which also starred Rowan Atkinson, and the BBC comedy sketch series Harry Enfield and Chums. In 2008, she played Alice Coltrane in the Doctor Who episode "Turn Left". In 2010, she had a guest starring role as Emily in the Easter special of Jonathan Creek (The Judas Tree) and appeared in an episode of Lynda La Plante's ITV drama serial Above Suspicion. Walter also had a leading role in Christopher Guest's HBO mockumentary-style comedy Family Tree, starring opposite Chris O'Dowd.

Theatre 
Walter's latest theatre role is playing Sybil Chase in a production of Noel Coward's Private Lives, in which she will star opposite Nigel Havers and Patricia Hodge. Walter has previously worked with the director Sam Mendes at the Donmar Warehouse in a production of Alan Bennett's Habeas Corpus, was a member of the Peter Hall Company's production of As You Like It and featured in the National Theatre's revival of Noises Off. In 2008 to early 2009 she spent a year as a member of the Royal Shakespeare Company (RSC), with leading roles as Helena in A Midsummer Night's Dream and Maria in Love's Labour's Lost.  She also appeared in the hit stage comedy 39 Steps, which ran in the West End for a record-breaking nine years. Walter played Heidi Schumann in Peter Nichols's play Lingua Franca which premiered in London in July 2010 before transferring to New York later in the year.

Film 
Walter's most recent film role was starring as Melissa in Regarding Annabelle a short film by writer/director Gary Simpson which was included in the Official Selection at the Hollywood Short Film Festival and the European Short Film Festival. Walter's other film credits include Woody Allen's 2010 romantic comedy You Will Meet a Tall Dark Stranger, The Wedding Video, I Want Candy, Lady Godiva and Remember Me?.

Radio 
Walter has appeared on a number of programmes on BBC Radio 4, including Seekers, House of the Spirit Levels, Smelling of Roses, No Commitments and All My Life. In 2010 she played multiple comic characters in The Lucy Montgomery Show which was written by and starred Lucy Montgomery.

References 

1979 births
Living people
People from Woking
British television actresses
Actresses from Surrey
British stage actresses
British film actresses
Alumni of the Drama Centre London